Kingman is a city in and the county seat of Kingman County, Kansas, United States.  As of the 2020 census, the population of the city was 3,105.

History
Kingman was laid out in 1874. Like Kingman County, it was named for Samuel A. Kingman, chief justice of the supreme court.

Geography
Kingman is located at  (37.647024, -98.113805), next to the Ninnescah River.

Climate
The climate in this area is characterized by hot, humid summers and generally mild to cool winters.  According to the Köppen Climate Classification system, Kingman has a humid subtropical climate, abbreviated "Cfa" on climate maps.

Demographics

2010 census
As of the census of 2010, there were 3,177 people, 1,346 households, and 810 families living in the city. The racial makeup of the city was 96.7% White, 0.1% African American, 0.7% Native American, 0.4% Asian, 0.9% from other races, and 1.2% from two or more races. Hispanic or Latino of any race were 2.7% of the population.

There were 1,346 households, of which 29.3% had children under the age of 18 living with them, 46.7% were married couples living together, 9.7% had a female householder with no husband present, 3.9% had a male householder with no wife present, and 39.8% were non-families. 35.0% of all households were made up of individuals, and 18% had someone living alone who was 65 years of age or older. The average household size was 2.29 and the average family size was 2.95.

The median age in the city was 40.7 years. 24.9% of residents were under the age of 18; 8% were between the ages of 18 and 24; 21.6% were from 25 to 44; 23.3% were from 45 to 64; and 22.2% were 65 years of age or older. The gender makeup of the city was 47.7% male and 52.3% female.

2000 census
As of the census of 2000, there were 3,387 people, 1,407 households, and 911 families living in the city. The racial makeup of the city was 97.67% White, 0.21% African American, 0.35% Native American, 0.50% Asian, 0.30% from other races, and 0.97% from two or more races. Hispanic or Latino of any race were 1.92% of the population.

There were 1,407 households, out of which 28.9% had children under the age of 18 living with them, 52.7% were married couples living together, 9.5% had a female householder with no husband present, and 35.2% were non-families. 33.0% of all households were made up of individuals, and 18.8% had someone living alone who was 65 years of age or older. The average household size was 2.34 and the average family size was 2.95.

In the city, the population was spread out, with 26.4% under the age of 18, 7.1% from 18 to 24, 23.6% from 25 to 44, 20.2% from 45 to 64, and 22.7% who were 65 years of age or older. The median age was 40 years. For every 100 females, there were 84.3 males. For every 100 females age 18 and over, there were 82.7 males.

The median income for a household in the city was $36,018, and the median income for a family was $42,813. Males had a median income of $32,000 versus $23,988 for females. The per capita income for the city was $19,286. About 10.3% of families and 12.2% of the population were below the poverty line, including 24.4% of those under age 18 and 7.0% of those age 65 or over.

Education
The community is served by Kingman-Norwich USD 331 public school district, which operates 2 schools in Kingman.
 Kingman High School
 Kingman Elementary-Middle School

Private Schools
 St. Patrick Catholic School

Transportation
Bus service is provided daily eastward towards Wichita, Kansas and westward towards Pueblo, Colorado by BeeLine Express (subcontractor of Greyhound Lines).

Notable people

 George Aiton, Major League Baseball player.
 Clyde Cessna, founder of the Cessna Aircraft Corporation.
 Martin Dewey, American orthodontist.
 Eugene John Gerber, Roman Catholic bishop.
 Don Lock, Major League Baseball player.

Gallery
 Historic Images of Kingman, Special Photo Collections at Wichita State University Library

References

Further reading

External links

 City of Kingman
 Kingman - Directory of Public Officials
 Kingman city map, KDOT

Cities in Kansas
County seats in Kansas
Cities in Kingman County, Kansas
1874 establishments in Kansas
Populated places established in 1874